Pavel Korolyov (born 21 March 1968) is a Kazakhstani cross-country skier. He competed in the men's 30 kilometre freestyle event at the 1994 Winter Olympics.

References

1968 births
Living people
Kazakhstani male cross-country skiers
Olympic cross-country skiers of Kazakhstan
Cross-country skiers at the 1994 Winter Olympics
Place of birth missing (living people)
20th-century Kazakhstani people